Jayaba Mukne or Jaideoraoji Mukne also known as Paupera and Jagappa Nayak Mukne was first Koli ruler of Jawhar State. He also spelled as Jayaba Mukne, Jayaba Mookna, Jayab Mookney, Joya Mookney, Jayab Mukne, Jayaba Mukna. He founded the Jawhar State and Mukne Dynasty in 1306 which ruled for over six hundred years till 1947.

History 

He built the Mahalakshmi Temple, Dahanu on the installation of the flag of jawhar. According to peoples, he had a small mud fort at Mukane near tal pass as a Polygar. Once when he was visiting at a shrine at Pimpri, He was blessed by five mendicants and saluted as Raja of Jawhar. Thereupon he marched northwards and acknowledged by peoples of Peint and Dharampur. He went to Surat and as far north as Kathiawar in Gujarat. There he remained for seven years. On his return from Kathiawad, He went to Jawhar and conquered it. He married Rani Mohanabai of Dharmagad. Rani gave birth to two sons named Nem Shah and Holkar Rao Mukne. After his death, he was succeeded by his elder son Nem Shah on 5 June 1343. Nem Shah was recognised as a Raja of Jawhar and given the title of Shah by Sultan of Delhi Sultanate Muhammad bin Tughluq.

References 

Year of birth missing
1343 deaths
14th-century Indian monarchs
Koli people